The Copa del Presidente de la República 1933 (President of the Republic's Cup) was the 33rd staging of the Copa del Rey, the Spanish football cup competition.

The competition started on April 9, 1933, and concluded on June 25, 1933, with the final, held at the Montjuïc Stadium in Barcelona. Athletic Bilbao won their 13th title, the fourth in a row.

Teams
As in the previous tournaments, the teams qualified through the Regional Championships:
Asturias (3): Oviedo FC, Sporting de Gijón, Club Gijón
Balearic Islands (1): CD Constancia
Canary Islands (1): Real Club Victoria
Cantabria (2): Racing de Santander, Gimnástica de Torrelavega
Catalonia (3): FC Barcelona, CD Español, Palafrugell FC
Galicia (3): Club Celta, Deportivo La Coruña, Racing Ferrol
Gipuzkoa–Navarre–Aragon (5): Unión Club, Donostia FC, CD Logroño, CA Osasuna, Zaragoza FC
Murcia (2): Murcia FC, Hércules FC
Center-South Region (5): Madrid FC, Athletic Madrid, Valladolid Deportivo, Sevilla FC, Betis Balompié
West Region (1): Club Recreativo Onuba
Valencia (3): Valencia FC, CD Castellón, Levante FC
Biscay (3): Athletic Bilbao, Baracaldo FC, Arenas Club

Round of 32
The first leg was played on April 9. The second leg was played on April 16.

|}

Round of 16
The first leg was played on May 7. The second leg was played on May 14. 

|}
Tiebreaker

|}

Quarter-finals
The first leg was played on May 28. The second leg was played on June 4. 

|}

Semi-finals
The first leg was played on June 11. The second leg was played on two dates: CD Español-Athletic on June 16 and Valencia FC-Madrid FC on June 18. 

|}

Final

Notes

References

External links
rsssf.com
 linguasport.com

1933
1933 domestic association football cups
1932–33 in Spanish football